Kingston Buci was an electoral division of West Sussex in the United Kingdom, and returned one member to sit on West Sussex County Council. It was abolished as a result of boundary changes for the 2017 election.

Extent and History
The division covers the neighbourhood of Kingston-by-Sea, which forms part of the town of Shoreham-by-Sea. The seat has been won by the Conservative Party at each election held since the seat was created in 2004. In April 2013 Paul Graysmark defected from the Conservative Party to UKIP, making the defence in 2013 a defence for UKIP.

It falls entirely within the un-parished area of Shoreham-by-Sea and comprises the following district wards: the north part of St. Mary's Ward, Southlands Ward and the north part of Southwick Green Ward.

Election results

2013 Election
Results of the election held on 2 May 2013:

2009 Election
The results of the election held on 4 June 2009:

2005 Election
Results of the election held on 5 May 2005:

References
Election Results - West Sussex County Council

External links
 West Sussex County Council
 Election Maps

Electoral Divisions of West Sussex